The 1987–88 Southwest Indoor Soccer League was the second season of the American Southwest Indoor Soccer League.

League standings

Playoffs

Austin Sockadillos vs Albuquerque Gunners
 Austin Sockadillos defeated Albuquerque Gunners

Oklahoma City Warriors vs Arlington Arrows

 Oklahoma City Warriors advance, winning two out of three games.

Final

 MVP:  Mike Cook

Goals leaders

Awards
MVP: Austin Hudson, Oklahoma City Warriors 
Top Goal Scorer: Uwe Balzis, Albuquerque Gunners (43 goals)
Assist Leader: Austin Hudson, Oklahoma city Warriors (29 assists)
Top Goalkeeper: Todd Brunskill, Addison Arrows
Rookie of the Year: Steve Bailey, Austin Sockadillos
Coach of the Year: Chico Villar, Oklahoma City Warriors

References
The Year in American Soccer - 1988

Sou
2
USISL indoor seasons